The C&C 32 is a Canadian sailboat, that was designed by C&C Design and first built in 1981.

Production
The boat was built by C&C Yachts in Canada, but it is now out of production.

Design
The C&C 32 is a small recreational keelboat, built predominantly of fiberglass, with wood trim. It has a  masthead sloop rig, an internally-mounted spade-type rudder and a fixed fin keel or, optionally, a fixed stub keel and centreboard.

The fixed keel version displaces  and carries  of lead ballast, while the centreboard version displaces  and carries  of lead ballast.

The boat is fitted with a Universal Atomic 4  gasoline engine. A Yanmar 2GM diesel engine was available optionally.

The fin keel version has a PHRF racing average handicap of 162 with a high of 172 and low of 156. The stub keel and centreboard version has a PHRF racing average handicap of 171 with a high of 171 and low of 171.

Operational history
In a review Michael McGoldrick wrote, "The C&C 32 captures the essence of the cruiser/club racer of the early 1980s. While this boat may not [have] emerged as a C&C classic, it does epitomize the builder's work at the height of its role and reputation in the Canadian sailboat industry. In many ways, this boat seems like the natural evolution of what C&C had started with its earlier 27 and 30 foots models, only everything is a little larger, and its lines are little more modern looking. Below is the familiar dinette arrangement opposite a full length settee, a layout which it has in common with its earlier predecessors. However, the interior of the 32 also has room for a quarter berth and a permanent chart table/navigation station. Outside is a large T-shaped cockpit, and the nice clean lines of the deck and cabin is what helped earn C&C a reputation for coming up with good looking designs."

See also
List of sailing boat types

Similar sailboats
Aloha 32
Bayfield 30/32
Beneteau 323
Catalina 320
Columbia 32
Contest 32 CS
Douglas 32
Hunter 32 Vision
Hunter 326
J/32
Mirage 32
Morgan 32
Nonsuch 324
Ontario 32
Ranger 32
Watkins 32

References

Keelboats
1980s sailboat type designs
Sailing yachts
Sailboat type designs by C&C Design
Sailboat types built by C&C Yachts